Mark Lewis Mendick Roeder (born 28 May 1957) is an Australian-British author and cultural commentator. He has written The Big Mo (book): Why Momentum Rules The World (2011), and Unnatural Selection: Why The Geeks Will Inherit The Earth (2013). Roeder's books and articles explore social phenomena and the impact of technology on human behaviour.

Background and education
Roeder was born in London, England. His father, Reuben Mendick, was a medical doctor and dux of George Heriot's School in Edinburgh, Scotland. Roeder's maternal great, great grandfather is the author Frank Fowler, who played a significant role in Australia's early literary history. Roeder holds a master's degree in Business and Technology (MBT) from the University of NSW.

Career
Before becoming a writer, Roeder worked as a corporate executive, and held senior roles at UBS Banking Group, Zurich Insurance Group and Westpac and lived in London, New York, Sydney and Zurich. He currently works as a consultant with David Hale (economist) Global Economics, and is a Delphi Fellow contributor to Big Think.

Works
Roeder's book, The Big Mo (2011), explores the role that large-scale momentum played in the global financial crisis. It was described by the Financial Times as 'A compelling book that journeys seamlessly from finances to the Iraq war, from oil prices and climate change to religion and pop culture in an effort to explain how we behave and why we are so easily led.' Roeder explained that, 

The ABC broadcaster and critic Phillip Adams described The Big Mo as 'a revelation. In our personal, political and economic lives we seem to be swept along by circumstances. Our attempts to change direction are doomed. The Big Mo explains why.' The Guardian 's Steven Poole, criticised the book for 'overstretching the Newtonian-physics analogy'.
Roeder's book, Unnatural Selection: Why the Geeks will Inherit the Earth (2013), analyses the impact of technology on human evolution and the rise of the ‘geek’ class. It suggests that the Man-made environment of the Anthropocene is selecting for more non-neurotypical traits in humans, compared to previous generations, which is fostering a cognitive revolution in the human species.

Bibliography
 What We Do Next Really Matters. (2022). Australian Scholarly Publishing & Arden International. 
Unnatural Selection: Why the Geeks Will Inherit the Earth. (2013). HarperCollins. , (2014) Arcade Publishing (USA & Europe) 
The Big Mo: Why Momentum Rules the World. (2011). HarperCollins (Australasia) , Random House (Europe and Global) , Xinhua Publishing House (China).  
"What’s Next (The Diminishing Returns of the Information Age – section)" (2012). David & Lyric Hale. Yale University Press. ,
 Space Invaders. Co-authored as Mark Mendick with Julian Wolanski. Consolidated Press.

References

External links
Big Think
Mark Roeder official website
Speakers Bureau
Australian Literary Management
Big Mo website
Diserta Bureau
David Hale Global Economics

1957 births
Living people
British writers
Australian writers
Writers from London
British expatriates in Australia